The Polish Legions was a name of the Polish military force (the first active Polish army in generations) established in August 1914 in Galicia soon after World War I erupted between the opposing alliances of the Triple Entente on one side (comprising the British Empire, the French Republic and the Russian Empire); and the Central Powers on the other side, comprising the German Empire and Austria-Hungary. The Legions became "a founding myth for the creation of modern Poland" in spite of their considerably short existence; they were replaced by the Polish Auxiliary Corps formation on 20 September 1916, merged with Polish II Corps in Russia on 19 February 1918 for the Battle of Rarańcza against Austria-Hungary, and disbanded following the military defeat at the Battle of Kaniów in May 1918, against imperial Germany. General Haller escaped to France to form the Polish army in the West against the anti-Polish German-Bolshevik treaty.

The Legions took part in many battles against the forces of the Imperial Russia, both in Galicia and in the Carpathian Mountains. They suffered horrendous casualties outnumbered three to one in the Battle of Łowczówek. They captured Kielce, and in 1915 took part in the offensive on Warsaw. In June 1916 the unit had approximately 25,000 soldiers. Both the number of troops and the composition of units changed rapidly. After the Battle of Kostiuchnówka where 2,000 Polish soldiers died delaying a Russian offensive, Józef Piłsudski demanded that the Central Powers issue a guarantee of independence for Poland and partially succeeded. The Polish Legions became the Polish Auxiliary Corps. After the Act of 5th November of 1916 which pronounced the creation of the puppet Kingdom of Poland of 1916–18, the Polish Legions were transferred under German command. However, most of the members refused to swear allegiance to the German Kaiser and were interned in Beniaminów and Szczypiorno (the Oath crisis). Approximately 3,000 of them were drafted into the Austro-Hungarian army and sent to the Italian Front while approximately 7,500 stayed in the  Polish Auxiliary Corps, part of the failed German Polnische Wehrmacht.

History
According to Prit Buttar, "When war broke out, Piłsudski was quick to recognize that an important preliminary step in Poland's path to independence was the defeat of tsarist Russia..." Piłsudski was no supporter of the Central Powers, and once Russia had been driven out of Polish territory, he believed that he and his fellow Poles would have to persuade the Germans and Austro-Hungarians to leave too, but he held secret meetings with representatives of France and Great Britain to make clear to the western members of the Entente that Polish troops would never fight against them, only against Russia."

The formation of the Legions was declared by Józef Piłsudski in his order of August 22, 1914. The Austrian government, having jurisdiction over the area, officially agreed to the formation on August 27, 1914.

The unit became an independent formation of the Austro-Hungarian Army thanks to the efforts of the KSSN and the Polish members of the Austrian parliament. Personnel came mostly from former members of various scouting organizations, including Drużyny Strzeleckie and Związek Strzelecki, as well from as volunteers from all around the Austro-Hungarian Empire.

Initially, the Polish Legions were composed of two legions: the Eastern and the Western Legion, both formed on August 27. After a Russian victory in the Battle of Galicia (August–September 1914) the Eastern Polish legion refused to fight on behalf of the Austro-Hungarian side against Russia and was disbanded on September 21. On December 19, the Western legion was transformed into three brigades: the I Brigade of the Polish Legions under Józef Piłsudski, formed in mid-December; the II Brigade of the Polish Legions under Józef Haller de Hallenburg, formed between mid-December and March (sources vary); and the III Brigade of the Polish Legions under Zygmunt Zieliński (later Bolesław Roja), formed on May 8, 1915. All brigades had the following:
 Artillery Battalions with served with I, II, and III Brigade
 Cavalry Regiments: 1st served in I Brigade; 2nd served in II Brigade; 3rd served in III Brigade
 Infantry Regiments: 1st, 5th, 7th served in I Brigade; 2nd, 3rd served in II Brigade; 4th served in both II and III Brigades; 5th, 6th served in III Brigade.

The commanders of the Legions were consecutively: Gen. Karol Trzaska-Durski (September 1914 – February 1916), Gen. Stanisław Puchalski (until November 1916), Col. Stanisław Szeptycki (until April 1917), and Col. Zygmunt Zieliński (until August 1917). After the war ended the officers of the Polish Legions became the backbone of the Polish Army.

Battles
Below is a list of prominent Polish battles against the Imperial Russian Army in 191416, leading to victories in most cases, with notable exceptions especially during the Brusilov Offensive of 1916.
 Battle of Nowy Korczyn (23–24 September 1914)
 Battle of Anielin-Laski (October 21–October 26, 1914)
 Battle of Mołotków (October 29, 1914)
 Battle of Krzywopłoty (17–18 November 1914)
 Battle of Marcinkowice (5–6 December 1914)
 Battle of Łowczówek (December 22–December 25, 1914)
 Battle of Pustki (2 May 1915)
 Battle of Konary (May 16–May 25, 1915)
 Battle of Rafajłowa (January 23–24, 1915)
 Kirlibaba (January 18–22, 1915)
 Rarańcza (June 13, 1915)
 Battle of Rokitna (15 June 1915)
 Battle of Jastków (July 29–July 31, 1915)
 Battle of Kostiuchnówka (July 4–July 6, 1916)
 Battle of Rarańcza (15–16 February 1918)

Notable officers who served in the Polish Legions
Following the foundation of the Second Polish Republic, many served in the Polish Army, and held political as well as elected offices.

Polish Legions' prominent members

See also

 Polish Legions (disambiguation)
 Stanisław Skarżyński
 Czesław Zbierański
 Association of the Polish Youth "Zet"
 Blue Army (Poland)
 First Cadre Company
 Greater Poland Uprising (1918–1919)
 Kingdom of Poland (1916–1918)
 List of Polish divisions in World War I
 My Pierwsza Brygada
 Polish Army Veterans' Association in America
Polish Legion of American Veterans
 Polish Auxiliary Corps
 Polish I Corps in Russia
 Polish II Corps in Russia
 Polish 1st Legions Infantry Division
 Polish Military Organisation
 Polish Rifle Squads
 Polska Siła Zbrojna
 Riflemen's Association
 Union of Active Struggle
 The Seven Lancers of Belina

External links
 Centek, Jarosław: Polish Legions , in: 1914-1918-online. International Encyclopedia of the First World War.
 Brudek, Paweł: Polish Legionaries Union , in: 1914-1918-online. International Encyclopedia of the First World War.

Notes and references

 
Military units and formations of Austria-Hungary in World War I
Military units and formations established in 1914
1914 establishments in Poland
Józef Piłsudski